The Menands Bridge, officially known as the Troy-Menands Bridge, is a four-span through truss bridge that carries New York State Route 378 across the Hudson River in New York connecting Menands with Troy. Built in 1933, the crossing is supported by concrete piers and - even though it was designed and constructed at the end of the first third of the 20th century - was originally fitted with a lift section to accommodate tall ships.

The section's lifting device was removed in 1966, but the elevating towers remained until their removal in the summer of 2000.

See also
List of fixed crossings of the Hudson River

References

External links
 Troy-Menands Bridge at Capital Highways

Bridges over the Hudson River
Bridges completed in 1933
Vertical lift bridges in New York (state)
Road bridges in New York (state)
Truss bridges in the United States
Bridges in Albany County, New York
Bridges in Rensselaer County, New York